The Federal budget 2015–16 is the federal budget of Pakistan for the fiscal year beginning from 1 July 2015 and ending on 30 June 2016. The budget was presented in the Parliament by the Minister of Finance, Ishaq Dar on June 5, 2015.

References 

Nawaz Sharif administration
2015 in Pakistan
Pakistani budgets
Pakistan federal budget
Pakistan federal budget
2016 in Pakistan
2016 in Pakistani politics